The Battle of Dogger Bank was a naval engagement during the First World War that took place on 24 January 1915 near the Dogger Bank in the North Sea between squadrons of the British Grand Fleet and the Kaiserliche Marine (High Seas Fleet). 

The British surprised the smaller and slower German squadron, which fled for home. During a stern chase lasting several hours, the British caught up with the Germans and engaged them with long-range gunfire. The German squadron returned to harbour, with some ships in need of extensive repairs. The Germans lost Blücher and most of her crew. The British flagship Lion was out of action for several months, but they lost no ships and suffered few casualties. 

After the British victory, both navies replaced officers who were thought to have shown poor judgement and made changes to equipment and procedures because of failings observed during the battle.

Summary

Ships present

 The German Navy's torpedo boats were of similar size and function to the destroyers in the Royal Navy, and are often referred as such.

Abbreviations

Abbreviations for Officers’ Ranks
 Adm / Admiral
 VAdm / Vice-admiral : Vizeadmiral / VAdm
 RAdm / Rear-admiral : Konteradmiral / KAdm
 Cdre / Commodore : Kommodore / Kom
 Capt / Captain : Kapitän zur See / KptzS
 Cdr / Commander : Fregattenkapitän / FKpt
 Lt Cdr / Lieutenant-commander : Korvettenkapitän / KKpt
 Lt / Lieutenant : Kapitänleutnant / KptLt
 SLt / Sub-lieutenant : Oberleutnant zur See / OLtzS

Other Abbreviations
 AdC.: Aide de Camp to The King
 C.B.: Companion of The Most Honourable Order of the Bath
 C.M.G.: Companion of The Most Distinguished Order of Saint Michael and Saint George
 C.V.O.: Commander of The Royal Victorian Order
 D.F: Destroyer Flotilla
 D.S.C.: Distinguished Service Cross
 D.S.O.: Distinguished Service Order
 HMS: His Majesty's Ship
 SMS: Seiner Majestät Schiff (German; translation: His Majesty's Ship)
 K.C.B.: Knight Commander of The Most Honourable Order of the Bath
 M.V.O.: Member of The Royal Victorian Order
 the Hon.: The Honourable

Royal Navy

Battlecruiser Force
 1st Battlecruiser Squadron
 Vice-Admiral Sir David Beatty, K.C.B., M.V.O., D.S.O.
  (flagship):  Capt Alfred E. M. Chatfield, C.V.O.
 :  Capt Henry B. Pelly, M.V.O.
 :  Capt Osmond de B. Brock, A.d.C.

 2nd Battlecruiser Squadron
 Rear-Admiral Sir Archibald Moore, K.C.B., C.V.O.
  (flagship):  Capt Lionel Halsey, C.M.G., A.d.C.
 :  Capt Francis W. Kennedy

 1st Light Cruiser Squadron
 Commodore (2nd Class) William E. Goodenough, M.V.O.
 : Cdre Goodenough
 :  Capt Charles B. Miller
 :  Capt Arthur A. M. Duff
 :  Capt Theobald W. B. Kennedy

Harwich Force
 Commododre (T) Reginald Y. Tyrwhitt, C.B.
  (light cruiser) Cdre Tyrwhitt

 Attached Destroyers
 :  Capt the Hon. Herbert Meade
 : Cdr Barry E. Domvile 
 : Cdr Rafe G. Rowley-Conwy
 : Lt-Cdr Henry R. Clifton Mogg
 : Lt-Cdr James L. Forbes
 : Lt-Cdr Ernest H. B. Williams
 : Cdr Reginald Henniker-Heaton

 1st Destroyer Flotilla
  Captain Wilmot S. Nicholson
  (flotilla cruiser, Capt Nicholson)
 1st Division/1st D.F.
 : Cdr Brien M. Money
 : Lt-Cdr Cyril Callaghan
 : Lt-Cdr Robert S. Buchanan
 : Lt-Cdr James V. Creagh
 3rd Division/1st D.F.
 : Cdr Geoffrey Mackworth
 : Lt-Cdr Montague G. B. Legge
 : Lt-Cdr Cecil H. H. Sams
 : Lt-Cdr Roger V. Allison
 4th Division/1st D.F.
 : Cdr Cecil G. Chichester
 : Lt-Cdr Paul Whitfield
 : Lt-Cdr Francis G. C. Coates
 : Lt-Cdr John C. Tovey
 5th Division/1st D.F.
 : Cdr Dashwood F. Moir
 : Lt-Cdr Michael K. H. Kennedy
 : Lt-Cdr Alexander H. Gye

 3rd Destroyer Flotilla
 Captain Francis G. St. John, M.V.O.
  (flotilla cruiser, Capt St.John)
 1st Division/3rd D.F.
 : Cdr Arthur B. S. Dutton
 : Lt-Cdr George W. Taylor
 : Lt-Cdr Bruce Lloyd Owen
 2nd Division/3rd D.F.
 : Cdr George P. England
 : Lt-Cdr Reginald B. C. Hutchinson D.S.C.
 : Cdr Malcolm L. Goldsmith
 : Lt-Cdr Ralph M. Mack
 3rd Division/3rd D.F.
 : Cdr Graham R. L. Edwards
 : Lt-Cdr Arthur A. Scott
 : Lt-Cdr George H. Knowles
 : Lt-Cdr Richard W. U. Bayly
 4th Division/3rd D.F.
 : Lt-Cdr Claud F. Allsup
 : Lt-Cdr Charles E. Hughes-White

 8th Submarine Flotilla
 Commododre (S) Roger Keyes
 Destroyers
 : Lt-Cdr Alfred B. Watts
 : Cdr Wilfred Tomkinson
 Deployed submarines
 : Lt-Cdr E. W. Leir
 : Lt-Cdr F. Fielmann
 : Lt-Cdr F. H. H. Goodhart
 : Lt-Cdr M. E. Nasmith

Imperial German Navy 

 1st Scouting Group (I. Aufklärungsgruppe) (battlecruisers)
 Konteradmiral Franz von Hipper
  (flagship): Kapt.z.S. Moritz von Egidy (GE)
 : Kapt.z.S. Magnus von Levetzow(GE)
 : Kapt.z.S. Ludwig von Reuter
  : F.Kapt. Alexander Erdmann

 2nd Scouting Group (II. Aufklärungsgruppe) (light cruisers)
 Konteradmiral Georg Hebbinghaus
  (flagship): F.Kapt. Theodor Püllen (GE)
 : F.Kapt. Viktor Harder
 : Kapt.z.S. Johannes Hartog
 : F.Kapt. Wilhelm Widenmann(GE)

 5th Torpedo-Boat Flotilla (V. Torpedoboots Flottille)
 K.Kapt. Bernd von dem Knesebeck
 : Kptlt. Hans Loening

 9th Half-Flotilla (9. halbflottille)
 : Kptlt. Walter Hoffert
 : Kptlt. Kurt Heeseler
 : Kptlt. Wolf von Eichhorn

 10th Half-Flotilla (10. halbflottille)
 : K.Kapt. Oskar Heinecke
 : Kptlt. Hans Anschütz
 : Kptlt. Johannes Weineck
 : Kptlt. Adolf Müller
 : Kptlt. Gerhard Hoefer

 8th Torpedo-Boat Flotilla (VIII. Torpedoboots Flottille)
 : K.Kapt. Paul Hundertmarck

 15th Half-Flotilla (15. halbflottille)
 : K.Kapt. Georg Weißenborn
 : Kptlt. Hans Hufnagel
 : Kptlt. Carl August Claussen(GE)

 18th Half-Flotilla (18. halbflottille)
 : K.Kapt.   Werner Tillessen (GE)
 : Oblt.z.S. Hartmut Buddecke
 : Kptlt. Otto Andersen
 : Kptlt. Erich Steinbrinck
 :

Notes

References

Sources

British
 
 
 
 

German
 
 

Dogger Bank (1915)
Conflicts in 1915